Chris Spedding is the fifth, self-titled studio album by English singer-songwriter and guitarist Chris Spedding. It was a conscious attempt by Spedding to start a career under his own name and to have some 'hit singles' to establish a "Chris Spedding Sound".

2013 reissue
Chris Spedding was reissued on 14 October 2013 by Culture Factory USA, an independent label that specialises in cult artists. The reissue CD was packaged in a miniature replica of the original quality vinyl packaging complete with an inner sleeve that features the original lyrics, photographs of Spedding and credits for the album. The label side of the CD features a replica of what the original RAK label looked like at the time of issue and even features "grooves" as if the black CD is made of vinyl.

The reissues did not have any additional outtakes or bonus tracks.

Track listing
All tracks composed by Chris Spedding; except where indicated
"New Girl in the Neighbourhood"
"School Days"
"Sweet Disposition"
"Bedsit Girl"
"Guitar Jamboree"
"Jump in My Car" (Ted Mulry)
"Hungry Man"
"Motor Bikin'"
"Catch That Train"
"Nervous"
"Boogie City"

Personnel
Chris Spedding - guitar, vocals
Les Hurdle - bass
Dave Cochran - bass on "Motor Bikin'"
Brian Bennett, Tony Carr - drums
Barry Morgan - drums on "Motor Bikin'"
Chas Mills, Neil Lancaster, Tony Burrows - backing vocals
Technical
Douglas Hopkins - engineer
Gered Mankowitz - photography

References

External links
 

1976 albums
Albums produced by Mickie Most
Rak Records albums
Chris Spedding albums
British rock-and-roll albums